Otter Brook flows into the Black River near North Wilmurt, New York.

References 

Rivers of Herkimer County, New York
Rivers of New York (state)